Surf Nazis Must Die is a 1987 American post-apocalyptic action exploitation film directed by Peter George and starring Gail Neely, Barry Brenner, and Robert Harden.  It was produced by The institute, a production company formed by George, Craig A. Colton and Robert Tinnell, and distributed by Troma Entertainment, a company known for its low-budget exploitation films.

Plot
An earthquake leaves the California coastline in ruins and reduces the beaches to a state of chaos. A group of neo-Nazis led by Adolf (Brenner), the self-proclaimed "Führer of the new beach", takes advantage of the resulting chaos by fighting off several rival surfer gangs to seize control of the beaches. Meanwhile, an African American oil well worker named Leroy (Harden) is killed by the surf Nazis while jogging on the beach. Leroy's mother, "Mama" Washington (Neely), devastated by the loss of her son, vows revenge. After arming herself with a handgun and grenades, she breaks out of her retirement home and exacts vengeance on the Surf Nazis.

Cast
 Gail Neely as Eleanor "Mama" Washington
 Robert Harden as Leroy
 Barry Brenner as Adolf
 Dawn Wildsmith as Eva
 Michael Sonye as Mengele
 Joel Hile as Hook
 Gene Mitchell as Brutus
 Tom Shell as Smeg
 Bobbie Bresee as Smeg's Mom
 Tom Demenkoff as Ariel

Soundtrack

The soundtrack to Surf Nazis Must Die was scored by Jon McCallum and features heavy use of synthesizers.  The soundtrack had an official vinyl release by Strange Disc records in September 2014 with cover artwork also by McCallum.

 "Once You've Caught the Wave" (0:59)
 "Opening Titles" (1:44)
 "The Youth of Tomorrow" (1:48)
 "After the Quake" (5:53)
 "Across the River" (2:06)
 "Visit to the Morgue" (0:59)
 "In the Church" (2:01)
 "Nobody Goes Home" (2:12)
 "Mama Sends Her Love" (2:44)
 "Before the Fight" (3:26)
 "Chase Through the Boatyard" (5:10)
 "The Last Wave" (1:35)
 "Fangoria Weekend 1986 Promo" (2:27)

Reception
On Metacritic the film has a score of 28% based on reviews from 7 critics, indicating "generally unfavorable reviews".
On Rotten Tomatoes the film has an approval rating of 20% based on reviews from 5 critics.

Janet Maslin wrote "Not even the actors' relatives will find this interesting." Michael Wilmington of the Los Angeles Times called it a "total wipeout" and "a horror-action movie with dull action and horror, feebly done on every level: leaden satire, a repulsive romance, a revenge saga of zero intensity." Variety: "A sort of Clockwork Orange meets Mad Max on the beach, pic hasn't one redeeming feature." Roger Ebert stated that he walked out of the film after 30 minutes.

References

External links
 
 

1987 films
1987 action thriller films
1980s action comedy films
American satirical films
American action comedy films
American action thriller films
Punk films
American dystopian films
Films about race and ethnicity
Films set in Los Angeles
Films shot in Los Angeles
Troma Entertainment films
American surfing films
American post-apocalyptic films
Films about neo-Nazis
Films about neo-Nazism
1987 comedy films
1980s English-language films
1980s American films